Seven Communities may refer to:

Sette Comuni, seven Cimbrian comuni in Veneto, north-east Italy
Siebengemeinden, seven former Jewish communities in Eisenstadt, Austria